Gandepalle is a village in Gandepalle mandal, located in Kakinada district of the Indian state of Andhra Pradesh.

References 

Villages in Gandepalle mandal